Mike Kinsella (born March 4, 1977) is an American musician and singer-songwriter. Having been involved in many Illinois-based bands, he is best known as the lead vocalist and guitarist of the emo band American Football.

Kinsella's first musical project was serving as drummer for the band Cap'n Jazz, which he co-founded with his brother Tim.

With either Tim and/or cousin Nate Kinsella, he has also participated in the projects Owls and Joan of Arc.

In 2001, Kinsella began his current solo project, Owen, in which he performs vocals, guitar, bass, drums, keyboards, loops, etc. Kinsella was also in a band called The Shirts and Skins, with his wife. In 2013, he released two EPs with his latest project, Their / They're / There, featuring Evan Weiss of Into It. Over It. and Matthew Frank of Loose Lips Sink Ships. He has also been part of the band The One Up Downstairs, alongside American Football drummer Steve Lamos.

Many of his albums, including Owen and No Good for No One Now, were recorded at his mother's home.

Discography

References

External links
 Biography on a Joan of Arc fan site, archived
 Owen official website
 Owen live on The Current
 Owen Myspace page
 The Shirts and Skins Myspace page

Living people
American rock drummers
People from Buffalo Grove, Illinois
Musicians from Chicago
1977 births
American male drummers
20th-century American drummers
21st-century American singers
21st-century American drummers
20th-century American male musicians
21st-century American male singers